Yasman (Russian and Tajik: Ясман) is a jamoat in Tajikistan. It is located in Rasht District, one of the Districts of Republican Subordination.

References

Populated places in Districts of Republican Subordination
Jamoats of Tajikistan